Scoparia brunnea is a moth in the family Crambidae. It was described by Patrice J.A. Leraut in 1986. It is found in the Chinese provinces of Fujian and Yunnan.

The ground colour of the forewings is white, covered with pale brown scales. The transverse fasciae are white and the postmedian and subterminal line form an X shape. The hindwings are white, slightly brown at the termen.

Subspecies
Sineudonia brunnea brunnea (Fujian)
Scoparia brunnea hoenei (P. Leraut, 1986) (Yunnan)

References

Moths described in 1986
Scorparia